Haplochromis argenteus is a critically endangered species of cichlid fish that is endemic to the Lake Victoria system in Africa. The species declined rapidly after the Nile perch was introduced to Lake Victoria. Last reported from this lake in 1983, it was considered possibly extinct when evaluated by the IUCN in 2010. However, that same year, several were recorded during a fish survey of Lake Bisina, a satellite lake of Lake Kyoga.

References

argenteus
Fish of Lake Victoria
Fish described in 1922
Taxonomy articles created by Polbot